Lightweight rowing (abbreviated Lwt or Lt) is a category of rowing where limits are placed on the maximum body weight of competitors. According to the International Rowing Federation (FISA), this weight category was introduced "to encourage more universality in the sport especially among nations with less statuesque people".

At international level for crew boats the limits are:

Men: Crew average 70 kg (154.3 lb / 11 st 0.3 lb) - no rower over 72.5 kg (159.8 lb / 11 st 5.8 lb)
Women: Crew average 57 kg (125.6 lb / 8 st 13 lb) - no rower over 59 kg (130.0 lb / 9 st 4 lb)

History
The first lightweight events were added to the World Championships in 1974 for men and 1985 for women. Lightweight rowing was added to the Olympics in 1996 but this came under threat in 2002 when the Programme Commission of the IOC recommended that, outside combat sports and weightlifting, there should not be weight category events.  The executive board overturned this recommendation and lightweight rowing continues at the Olympics, though only in the men's and women's double sculls.

There are two Olympic-class lightweight events: men's double sculls and women's double sculls. From 1996 - 2016 the men's Lightweight 4- was included in the Olympics.

United Kingdom
In the United Kingdom, lightweight rowing is less prevalent than in the US. At university rowing level, lightweight categories are offered at BUCS events, such as the BUCS Regatta, alongside openweight categories. In addition, both the men's and women's lightweight boat races are contended between the universities of Oxford and Cambridge as part of the Lightweight Boat Races. In club rowing, regattas less often offer lightweight events. An exception is the Henley Women's Regatta where there are numerous lightweight categories. At the Henley Royal Regatta lightweight rowers are expected to compete in openweight categories.

Under British Rowing rules of racing, the lightweight limits during winter are different from those in summer.

United States 
At the collegiate level, many larger American Division I schools can field between one and three lightweight boats for both men and women. 

In both lightweight men's and lightweight women's collegiate rowing, competition at the school-funded 'Varsity' level is small but fiercely competitive; the de facto national championship for both disciplines is the Intercollegiate Rowing Association Championship held each year on Mercer Lake in New Jersey on the weekend after Memorial Day. However, several club rowing programs (e.g., California Lightweight Crew), which receive minimal or no school funding, consistently field lightweight crews that compete for Division III equivalent titles at the Dad Vail Regatta on the Schuylkill River in Philadelphia, and, most recently, at the American Collegiate Rowing Association Championships.

In the US collegiate category, the following limits apply as of spring 2011:

High school age U.S. rowing teams also often compete in lightweight categories. In recent years the practice of juniors training down to a weight has been questioned, as low BMI has been linked to health and growth problems in adolescents. In 2019, USRowing introduced a protocol to require junior athletes to be assessed by their physicians to ensure they can compete as lightweights safely.

In the High School category, the following limits apply as of spring 2013:

References

External links
 Fight In The Dog — Coverage of US women's collegiate lightweight rowing

Rowing